Heresy is a comedy talk show on BBC Radio 4, created and originally hosted by David Baddiel, now hosted by Victoria Coren Mitchell. In the show, the presenter and a panel of guests commit "heresy" by challenging people's most deeply received opinions on a subject, in front of a studio audience.

For example, received wisdom in 2004 was  that New Labour is all about spin, so the panel tried to argue that New Labour was not all about spin, and the guests had to try to make the audience change their minds. Other assumptions challenged have included, "We should never negotiate with terrorists", "Television is dumbing down" and "We are on the brink of an environmental catastrophe".

The pilot and first series had four guests on each episode, but this has since been reduced to three. In the fifth series, Coren Mitchell replaced Baddiel as host.

In one episode Jo Brand made a joke about milkshake being thrown over politicians and suggested that battery acid might be used instead. This was heavily criticised in the media and Ofcom looked into the case but did not pursue an investigation.

Episodes

Pilot and Series 1

Series 2

Series 3

Series 4

Series 5

Series 6

Series 7

Series 8

Series 9

Series 10

Series 11

Series 12

References

External links

BBC Radio comedy programmes
2003 radio programme debuts
BBC Radio 4 programmes